The Vet River is a westward-flowing tributary of the Vaal River in central South Africa. Its sources are between Marquard and Clocolan and the Vet River flows roughly northwestwards to meet the Vaal at the Bloemhof Dam near Hoopstad.

Erfenis Dam was built on this river in order to provide water for the town of Theunissen.

Tributaries

Its main tributary is the Sand River which joins it from the east.

The actual Vet river is formed at the confluence of the Klein Vet and the Groot Vet upstream from the Erfenis Dam.

See also 
 List of rivers in South Africa
 Middle Vaal Water Management Area

References

External links
Free State Region River Systems
Military History Journal, Vol 10 No 3 - The skirmish at Vet River, 1846

Karoo
Rivers of the Free State (province)